{{DISPLAYTITLE:C15H22O2}}
The molecular formula C15H22O2 (molar mass : 234.33 g/mol) may refer to: 

 Coprinol
 3,5-Di-tert-butylsalicylaldehyde
 Polygodial, an active constituent of Dorrigo Pepper, Mountain Pepper, Horopito, Canelo, Paracress and Water-pepper
 Valerenic acid, a sesquiterpenoid constituent of the essential oil of the Valerian plant